Krottendorf-Gaisfeld is a municipality in the district of Voitsberg in the Austrian state of Styria.

Geography
The municipality lies west of Graz.

References

Cities and towns in Voitsberg District